Danny Stassar (born 19 September 1997) is a Dutch football player who plays for RKSV Groene Ster.

Club career
He made his professional debut in the Eredivisie for Roda JC Kerkrade on 9 December 2016 in a game against FC Groningen.

References

External links
 
 

1997 births
Sportspeople from Heerlen
Living people
Dutch footballers
Roda JC Kerkrade players
Eredivisie players
Association football defenders
RKSV Groene Ster players
Footballers from Limburg (Netherlands)